Rhodesians Worldwide is a quarterly contact magazine for Rhodesian citizens and other people who desire to maintain a link with Rhodesia. It is distributed in 60 countries. It is affiliated with many other Rhodesian diaspora organisations, in the UK, RSA, Australia and New Zealand.

The magazine's editorial staff maintain contact with several worldwide Rhodesian organisations. They are dedicated to preserving the history of Rhodesia and her people. In 2008 the quarterly was cited in a dissertation by a student of the University of Helsinki. It is non-political, non-partisan, and does not accept political advertising.

History
The magazine was founded in Australia by Geoff Hill in approximately 1984. Its base was moved to the United Kingdom ca. 1986, when Peter and Julia Hagelthorn became its editors. In 1998 Chris and Annette Whitehead took over as editors, basing the magazine in the United States.

References

External links

1984 establishments in Australia
Magazines published in the United Kingdom
Local interest magazines published in the United States
Magazines established in 1984
Magazines published in Arizona
Quarterly magazines published in the United States